Emma “EMM” Norris is an American alternative-pop singer, songwriter, producer, and content creator from Traverse City, Michigan, based in Los Angeles. She was one of the first women to release a full-length album, “Burning in the Dark,” which she created in its entirety from start to finish, including writing, producing, performing, mixing and mastering. Curve (magazine) described EMM, saying, "She is the definition of a thriving independent artist: calling all the shots in her own career, making her visions come to life, having a hand in every sonic choice and every melody you hear, betting on herself, and standing up for what she believes in most. Impossible to control, and impossible to contain, EMM is a force." Additionally, EMM was featured in USA Today and Business Wire for her involvement in the social media app Flipagram (now known as Vigo Video).

Early life
EMM was born and raised in Traverse City, Michigan. EMM comes from the background of musicians; her father, an opera singer, is a vocal coach at Interlochen Center for the Arts, and her mother is a classical harpist. EMM was homeschooled for most of her childhood.

Discography

Mixtapes

Singles

References

External links
 

Singer-songwriters from Michigan
American women pop singers
American women singer-songwriters
Record producers from Michigan